The Baloch Republican Army (BRA) was an armed militant group in Balochistan, Pakistan. It was believed to be the militant wing of Baloch Republican Party. In September 2010, the Government of Pakistan banned the Baloch Republican Army.

Brahumdagh Bugti was the head of BRA, until its merger with United Baloch Army (UBA). In 2017 Bugti's asylum request was rejected by Swiss authorities. The Swiss authorities said that Bugti's asylum request was rejected because he was involved in terror-related activities.

In January 2022, BRA merged with UBA, to form Baloch Nationalist Army (BNA). BRA and UBA also announced their dissolution following the establishment of Baloch Nationalist Army.

History
The Baloch Republican Army  was formed after the military operation in Dera Bugti and murder of a renowned Baloch leader, Nawab Akbar Bugti, by the Pakistan Army in 2006. In the beginning, the group was mostly joined by Bugti tribesmen but later years it gained popularity among Baloch students and in urban areas of Balochistan to fight against the “Pakistani oppression”. It is currently led by Brahumdagh Bugti.

In 2017, Bugti's asylum request was rejected by the Swiss government on the basis of Bugti's links with “incidents of terrorism, violence and militant activities". The same year also saw surrender of 143 militants belonging to Baloch Republican Army to the Pakistani authorities.

In 2018, another group of 70 militants belonging to Baloch Republican Army and their commander surrendered to Pakistani authorities.

In 2021, BRA claimed responsibility for destroying a statue of Pakistan's founding father, Muhammad Ali Jinnah.

In January 2022, the Baloch Republican Army (BRA) and the United Baloch Army (UBA) announced their dissolution and the formation of a new organisation the Baloch Nationalist Army (BNA).

References

Baloch nationalist militant groups
Balochistan
Paramilitary organisations based in Pakistan
National liberation movements
Rebel groups in Pakistan
Separatism in Pakistan
Research and Analysis Wing activities in Pakistan